Statistics of BEC Tero Sasana in Asian competition.

AFC Champions League

Results

Asian Club Championship

Results

References

Asia